1986–87 was the 40th season of the Western International Hockey League.

Standings

 Elk Valley Blazers	31		20	 9	 2							 42
 Nelson Maple Leafs 	30		17	11	 2							 36
 Cranbrook Royals	30		15	15	 0							 30
 Kimberley Dynamiters	28		 9	18	 1							 19
 Trail Smoke Eaters	21		 6	14	 1							 13

Trail Smoke Eaters suspended operations on January 29, 1987.

Playoffs

Semi finals

Best of 7

 Nelson Maple Leafs defeated Cranbrook Royals 4 games to 1 (4-0, 7-3, 8-6, 5-7, 10-1).
 Elk Valley Blazers defeated Kimberley Dynamiters 4 games to 0 (7-2, 16-1, E-K, 16-1).

Final

Best of 7

 Nelson Maple Leafs defeated Elk Valley Blazers 4 games to 2 (4-10, 6-4, 5-4 OT, 4-2, 5-4 OT, 4-2).

Nelson Maple Leafs win the Savage Cup and advanced to the 1986-87 Western Canada Allan Cup Playoffs.

References 

Western International Hockey League seasons
WIHL